is a compilation album by Japanese duo Pink Lady, released on September 16, 2009. The two-disc album features all of the duo's singles and B-sides from 1976 to 1981.

Track listing 
All lyrics written by Yū Aku, except where indicated; all music is composed and arranged by Shunichi Tokura, except where indicated.

References

External links

2009 compilation albums
Pink Lady (band) compilation albums
Japanese-language compilation albums
Victor Entertainment compilation albums